(literal translation: 'The Castle of Finland'), Op. 30, is concert overture for orchestra written between 1939 and 1940 by the Finnish composer Uuno Klami, who had visited the eponymous island sea fortress. Tor Mann and the Swedish Radio Symphony Orchestra premiered the work in Stockholm on 21 May 1941. The overture is in sonata form, with its main theme in C major and second theme in D-flat major.

The piece was lost in Germany during the "chaos" World War II, prompting Klami to rewrite it in 1944 based on his original sketches. Around this time, Klami renamed the overture  (The Fortress on the Sea), but this name has never stuck. The second version of the overture was premiered on 15 December 1944. The music critic Sulho Ranta argued that, although "the thematic material... [had] not greatly changed" between versions, "the revision [had] proved to be to the work's advantage".

On 29 September 1950 in celebration of Klami's fiftieth birthday, Jussi Jalas and the Helsinki Philharmonic Orchestra performed the overture. It shared the program with Klami's most famous work, the Kalevala Suite (Op. 23, 1933; r. 1934, 1943), and the Second Piano Concerto (Op. 41, 1950), which received its premiere.

Discography 
The sortable table below lists the three commercially available recordings of Suomenlinna:

Notes, references, and sources

Notes

References

Sources 

 
 

Compositions by Uuno Klami
1940 compositions
1944 compositions
Suomenlinna